Libido (also known as Mareqo, Mareko) is an Afroasiatic language of Ethiopia, which is spoken in the Mareko district Gurage Zone of the Southern Nations, Nationalities, and People's Region, directly south-east of Butajira. It has about 64,000 native speakers (2007 census).

It is closely related to Hadiyya (a dialect per Blench 2006) within the Highland East Cushitic languages. Its syntax is SOV; its verb has passive, reflexive and causative constructions, as well as a middle voice.

Notes

Further reading
Korhonen, Elsa, Mirja Saksa, and Ronald J. Sim. 1986. A dialect study of Kambaata-Hadiyya (Ethiopia) [part 1]. Afrikanistische Arbeitspapiere 5: 5-41.
Korhonen, Elsa, Mirja Saksa, and Ronald J. Sim. 1986. A dialect study of Kambaata-Hadiyya (Ethiopia), [part 2]: Appendices. Afrikanistische Arbeitspapiere 6: 71-121.

Languages of Ethiopia
East Cushitic languages
Subject–object–verb languages